Harbinxi (West) railway station is a railway station on the Jingha Railway and the Harbin–Dalian section of the Beijing–Harbin High-Speed Railway. It is located in Harbin, in the Heilongjiang province of China.

The station cost 7.01 billion yuan to construct. The main building contains  of space. There is a  weather shed. Ten platforms of some  serve twenty two rail lines and can accommodate a maximum of 12,000 passengers.

History
Construction of the station started on July 5, 2009 and the station opened to regular rail traffic in late 2012. On December 1, 2012, the station started to receive high-speed rail traffic as China unveiled its first high-speed rail running through regions with extremely low winter temperatures with scheduled runs from Harbin to Dalian. The weather-proof CRH380B bullet trains serving the line can accommodate temperatures from minus 40 degrees Celsius to 40 degrees Celsius above zero. On December 10, 2014, the station started to receive conventional train service of the Jingha Railway. On August 17, 2015, the station started to receive high-speed CRH trains from Qiqihar as Harbin–Qiqihar Intercity Railway opened for public service.

See also
Chinese Eastern Railway
South Manchuria Railway
South Manchuria Railway Zone

References

External links

Transport in Harbin
Railway stations in Harbin
Railway stations in China opened in 2012